The Edeka Group is the largest German supermarket corporation , holding a market share of 20.3%. Founded in 1907, it consists today of several co-operatives of independent supermarkets all operating under the umbrella organisation Edeka Zentrale AG & Co KG, with headquarters in Hamburg. There are approximately 4,100 stores with the Edeka nameplate that range from small corner stores to hypermarkets. On 16 November 2007, Edeka reached an agreement with Tengelmann to purchase a 70% majority stake in Tengelmann's Plus discounter store division, which was then merged into Edeka's Netto brand, with some 4,200 stores by 2018. Under all brands the company operated a total of 13,646 stores at the end of 2017.

History 
The cooperative was founded in 1907 as the E.d.K. (Einkaufsgenossenschaft der Kolonialwarenhändler im Halleschen Torbezirk zu Berlin, "Purchasing Cooperative of Colonial Goods Retailers in the Hallesches Tor district of Berlin"). In 1911, it was renamed as Edeka – a phonetic expansion of the previous abbreviation. The Edekabank was founded in 1914 and, from 1923, central billing was introduced. Although the name contains "Berlin", the group was officially founded in Leipzig.

After the Second World War, the reconstruction of the store network was led from the new Hamburg central offices. In 1972, the cooperatives changed structure and formed twelve regional companies, the umbrella corporation and the Edekabank converting from a cooperative to a public limited company.

In 2001, the Edeka own brand "Gut & Günstig" was founded. From 2003 to 2012 there was a cooperation with Globus SB-Warenhaus Holding.

Christmas 2015, the company attracted worldwide attention with the highly sentimental TV commercial #heimkommen, about a lonely grandfather desperate to reunite with his family for Christmas. Intended only for the German public, it reached over 43 million views worldwide on YouTube by 18 December 2015, and became a cultural phenomenon, with nearly 62 million views by June 2019.

A cooperation with Telekom Germany and the branding brand Edeka smart started on 15 February 2018. It replaced the existing cooperation with Vodafone and EDEKA mobil.

Brand names 
Operational names of these stores include:
 Bringmeister – online grocer
 nah und gut ("close and good") – stores up to 400 m2 (4300 sq ft), mostly found in smaller municipalities 
 EDEKA aktiv markt ("active mart") – mostly privately run supermarkets between 400 m2 and 800 m2 (4300 and 8600 sq ft), mostly located in outlying neighborhoods and villages
 EDEKA neukauf – privately  or centrally managed stores between 800 m2 and 2000 m2 (8600 and 21,500 sq ft)
 EDEKA – rebranded stores of aktiv markt and neukauf in most regions (e.g. all aktiv markt and neukauf stores of EDEKA Minden-Hannover and EDEKA Nord), regardless of whether privately or centrally managed stores
 EDEKA center (E-Center) – hypermarkets between 2000 m2 and 5000 m2 (21,500 and 54,000 sq ft)
 EDEKA C&C Großmarkt (Mios) (cash & carry)
 EDEKA Großverbraucherservice (for commercial customers)

Stores not operating under the Edeka brand, but belonging to the group nonetheless:
 SPAR (only in Germany)
 Netto Marken-Discount – discount stores 
 Marktkauf – hypermarkets, mainly in the west of Germany
 diska – discount store brand of EDEKA Nordbayern-Sachsen-Thüringen
 NP. – discount store brand of EDEKA Minden-Hannover

Former brands were:
 aktiv discount – rebranded E-Center or EDEKA stores, mainly in northern Germany
 Reichelt (later EDEKA Reichelt), mainly in Berlin, some stores in Brandenburg
 Treff 3000 – rebrandes as Netto Marken-Discount or EDEKA, discount store brand of EDEKA Südwest

It also had holdings in Denmark, which were sold in 2009.

Edeka also operates a number of companies providing related services, for example the Edekabank.

Controversies 
A 2019 Mother's Day online commercial showing a series of clips of fathers interacting with their children incompetently, followed by shots of caring mothers with their children, and the punchline "Mum, thank you for not being dad," was criticized widely for its stereotypical portrayal of the roles of mothers and fathers.

Stevie Schmiedel, a gender researcher and founder of the German branch of the feminist lobby organization "Pinkstinks," which campaigns against sexism in advertising, commented: "Maybe the advertisers really thought they were doing something good for women on Mother's Day. But everything went wrong. The commercial is pseudo-progressive. It divides and intensifies the fight between the sexes. A poisoned Mother's Day present."

Edeka was officially reprimanded by the Deutscher Werberat, the German advertising standards regulator, for breaching advertising standards by "reinforcing 1950's gender stereotypes," and while "ironic exaggeration is permissible, gender stereotyping is not." The authority also cited the large number of complaints and the debate about the commercial on social media, saying this showed that viewers either did not understand that it was meant to be ironical, or that they felt the ironic use of stereotypes was not acceptable to them.

References

External links

Supermarkets of Germany
Supermarkets of Denmark
Supermarkets
Companies based in Hamburg
Hamburg
German companies established in 1898
Retail companies established in 1898
German brands
Cooperatives in Germany
1898 establishments in Germany
Retailers' cooperatives
Multinational companies
Distribution (marketing)
Food retailers
Retail companies of Germany